Barnsley Interchange is a combined rail and bus station in the centre of Barnsley, South Yorkshire. It is on the Hallam and Penistone Lines, both operated by Northern Trains. On 20 May 2007, the new bus station and refurbished railway station were officially opened by Travel South Yorkshire, with the combined facility renamed to Barnsley Interchange.

Earlier history

The Sheffield, Rotherham, Barnsley, Wakefield, Huddersfield & Goole Railway was formed in 1846 with the aim of providing access to the South Yorkshire coalfield. It was to link the Manchester and Leeds Railway (M&LR) near Horbury, with the Sheffield and Rotherham Railway near , by way of Barnsley. Whilst the railway was still at the planning stage, it was split in two at Barnsley, the northern portion being leased to the M&LR and the southern to the South Yorkshire, Doncaster & Goole Railway (SYD&G). The northern section opened first, and Barnsley station was opened with the line on 1 January 1850. The route of the southern section was changed, and instead, is connected to the SYD&G line near . This section opened on 1 July 1851, and Barnsley then became a through station, although the two sections of line were operated by different railways.

Each of these railway companies went through various takeovers and amalgamations, until the early 20th century, when the station at Barnsley was co-owned by the Lancashire and Yorkshire Railway (LYR, successor to the M&LR), and the Great Central Railway (GCR, successor to the MS&LR and SYD&G). At the 1923 grouping, the GCR became part of the London and North Eastern Railway (LNER), whilst the LYR formed part of the new London, Midland and Scottish Railway (LMS), as did the Midland Railway (MR). Just two months later, on 1 August 1924, it was again renamed, this time to Barnsley Exchange.

Barnsley Court House station closed on 19 April 1960, following the commissioning of a new chord line south of the town near Quarry Junction that linked the former SYR route down the Blackburn Valley with the ex-Midland Railway line from Sheffield Midland, allowing services on the latter route to serve the station (and continue northwards to Wakefield & Leeds). Subsequently, on 13 June 1960, Barnsley Exchange was renamed Barnsley.

South Yorkshire Passenger Transport Executive rebuilt the station in 2007 to improve interchange with bus services, and the redesign won a Civic Building award.

Facilities

The station is fully staffed throughout the day, with the booking office open from 06:00 to 19:30 Mondays to Saturdays and from 08:45 to 19:00 on Sundays.  There are several self-service ticket machines provided for use outside these times and for collecting advance purchase tickets, located on the platform 2 side of the foot-bridge, and outside the ticket office. In the main building on platform 1, there is a waiting room and toilets.  A separate waiting room (with vending machines for drinks and snacks) is located on platform 2, with a fully accessible footbridge (equipped with lifts) linking them; there is step-free access from the entrance and bus station to all platforms.  Train running information is provided by automated announcements, digital display screens and timetable posters. There are a number of shops a short walk over the footbridge to the bus station, these include a newsagents, Lloyds Pharmacy, Coopland Bakery and a Subway restaurant.

In popular culture
In 2013 it was used as a filming location in Channel 4's cult drama series Utopia.

Rail services

Rail services operate frequently through Barnsley Interchange station. Two are express services, calling only at Wakefield Kirkgate en route to Leeds whilst the third is an all-stations local that runs via . On Sundays, the service reduces to one express service and one stopping service to Leeds each hour. Two northbound Sunday services from Nottingham to Leeds extend to  via the Settle-Carlisle Line.

On the Penistone line, there is an hourly service northbound to Huddersfield, now provided seven days a week.

Southbound there are four trains per hour (2 fast and 2 stopping). Two of these services terminate at Sheffield whilst one fast train carries on to Nottingham and the other fast service runs through to Lincoln Central (now laying foundations for the Northern Connect service, cutting out all stops between Sheffield and Worksop to reduce journey times). The service drops to three per hour (one fast & two stopping) on Sundays.

Furthermore, services to  will also be cut from Barnsley, this service will join Northern Connect and operate a new route via Wakefield Westgate with less stops on the Erewash Valley Line.

In May 1999, Midland Mainline commenced a daily weekday service to London St Pancras. The service was withdrawn by East Midlands Trains on 5 September 2008.

Bus services

The new Barnsley Interchange was opened on 20 May 2007 by Secretary of State for Transport Douglas Alexander. The new building forms the entire new complex of Barnsley Interchange. Rail and bus users exit the interchange via the new car park or, for the town centre, the new entrance and exit is on Eldon Street. It has 24 bus stands.

The bus station features the latest in technology such as the South Yorkshire Passenger Transport Executive scheme of "Your Next Bus", tracking buses with GPS to check what time they are due to arrive and depart. Several shops occupy retail units within the interchange, including Lloyd's Pharmacy, GT News, Cowpuccino Espresso Bar, Cooplands and a Subway.

Work has since been completed on the link road, Schwäbisch Gmünd Way (formerly Interchange Way), which was renamed in honour of Barnsley's twin town in Germany. That enables buses to enter or leave the Interchange quickly, without having to use the busy level crossing at Jumble Lane.

, the stand allocation is:

References

External links

Travel South Yorkshire website

Railway stations in Barnsley
DfT Category C2 stations
Bus stations in South Yorkshire
Former Lancashire and Yorkshire Railway stations
Former Great Central Railway stations
Railway stations in Great Britain opened in 1850
Northern franchise railway stations